This is a list of election results for the electoral district of Landsborough in Queensland state elections.

Members for Landsborough

Election results

Elections in the 1990s

Elections in the 1980s

Elections in the 1970s

Elections in the 1960s

Elections in the 1950s

References 

Queensland state electoral results by district